Egton with Newland, sometimes written as "Egton-with-Newland", is a civil parish in the South Lakeland district of the English county of Cumbria.  It includes the villages of Greenodd and Penny Bridge, and the hamlets of Arrad Foot, Newland and Newland Bottom. In the 2001 census the parish had a population of 898, decreasing at the 2011 census to 817.

It has a joint parish council with the parishes of Mansriggs and Osmotherley.

See also

Listed buildings in Egton with Newland
St Mary's Church, Penny Bridge

References

External links
Cumbria County History Trust: Egton with Newland (nb: provisional research only – see Talk page)
 

Civil parishes in Cumbria
South Lakeland District